James Williams (1888 – 1951) was an English footballer who played for Stoke City.

Career
Williams was born in Stoke-upon-Trent and played amateur football with Tunstall Swifts before joining Stoke City in 1908. He spent three seasons at the Victoria Ground during which time he was used as a reserve player and made nine appearances. In 1911 Williams returned to amateur football with Hanley Swifts.

Career statistics

References

English footballers
Stoke City F.C. players
1888 births
1960 deaths
Association football midfielders